Nicola J. Fox (born 1969) is the Associate Administrator for NASA's Science Mission Directorate, and was previously the Director of NASA's Heliophysics Science Division. She was the lead scientist for the Parker Solar Probe, and served as the Science and Operations Coordinator for the International Solar-Terrestrial Physics Science Initiative.

Early life and education 
Fox was born in Hitchin, Hertfordshire, England. When she was eight months old her father showed her the Apollo 11 moon landing on television. He continued to encourage her love of science, explaining to her the movement of the planets and identifying stars in the night's sky. She attended St. Francis' College in Letchworth Garden City, an all girls school. When she arrived at college she was often the only girl in her science classes.

Fox completed a bachelor's degree in physics at Imperial College London in 1990. She earned a master's degree in Telecommunications and Satellite Engineering at the University of Surrey in 1991. She returned to Imperial College London for her doctoral studies, and served as the Imperial College Union's Women's Officer. She completed a PhD in space and atmospheric physics at Imperial College London in 1995. Her dissertation considered geomagnetic storms. 

Fox moved to the Goddard Space Flight Center as a US National Research Council postdoctoral fellow, where she was mentored by Mario Acuña. At Goddard, Fox worked on Sun-Earth connections. Fox led outreach programs on space weather, and has continued public engagement throughout her scientific career.

Research and career 
Fox joined Johns Hopkins University Applied Physics Laboratory in 1998, where she remained as Science and Operations coordinator for the International Solar-Terrestrial Physics Science Initiative. Her research focuses on solar system plasma physics and data analysis. She studies the magnetopause using a range of spacecraft. She has since worked on the NASA Polar spacecraft . In 2008 Fox was the Deputy Project Scientist for Living With a Star, NASA's Van Allen Probe mission. In 2017 Fox delivered a TED talk on Touching the Sun.

Fox joined the Heliophysics space research branch in 2015. Fox moved to the NASA Headquarters in September 2018, when she was appointed as the Head of the Heliophysics Science Division. Work in the Heliophysics Science Division considers space phenomena relating to the sun, and includes robotic missions and satellites. She was lead Project Scientist for the Parker Solar Probe mission, and was present at the launch in August 2018. The probe looks to understand the coronal heating problem and the origins of the solar wind. The deputy director is Margaret Luce. Fox was appointed the Associate Administrator for NASA's Science Mission Directorate on February 27, 2023.

Fox has served as Associate Editor for Geophysical Research Letters and the Journal of Atmospheric and Solar-Terrestrial Physics. She is an expert for The Planetary Society.

Awards and honours 
1993 European Geosciences Union Young Scientists Award
1997 International Solar-Terrestrial Physics Science Initiative Outstanding Performance Award
1998 NASA Group Achievement Award
2000 NASA Group Achievement Award

Personal life 
Fox is married with two children.

References 

1969 births
Living people
Alumni of Imperial College London
Alumni of the University of Surrey
English expatriates in the United States
NASA people
People educated at St. Francis' College, Letchworth
People from Hitchin
Women astrophysicists
British astrophysicists